Heinrich Schweizer (born September 5, 1943) is a Swiss composer of classical music. Schweizer first rose to prominence with his Historical Symphony, completed in 1974, which was premiered by the American Symphony Orchestra conducted by David Gilbert at Avery Fisher Hall on May 14, 1979. Some of his other notable compositions include Sinfonietta, the Pentatonic and East West Symphony.

See also
List of Swiss composers

References

Living people
1943 births
20th-century classical composers
21st-century classical composers
Swiss male classical composers
Swiss classical composers
Swiss male composers
20th-century male musicians
21st-century male musicians
20th-century Swiss composers
21st-century Swiss composers